Tygerberg Nature Reserve is a  nature reserve on the Tygerberg Hills in the northern suburbs of Cape Town, South Africa.

This nature reserve one of the few surviving pockets of the highly threatened Swartland Shale Renosterveld vegetation type. The 300 ha reserve has an exceptional number of species. There are nearly five hundred different plant species here, twelve of which are threatened with extinction and eight of which exist only in Cape Town. Three of the plant species of Tygerberg exist only within the boundaries of the reserve itself. In addition, there are over a hundred bird species and a variety of wild mammals, reptiles and amphibians. The Plattekloof Dam is located just west of the hills, and is being restored to a natural wetland. 
The park hosts the Kristo Pienaar Environmental Education Centre with its library and resource centre. This is a popular venue for school excursions and education programmes.

The name Tygerberg (“Tiger Mountain”) comes from the characteristic spots, or “heuweltjies” which exist in Shale Renosterveld. They can be seen from a distance, covering these hills, and early settlers thus named the hills after an animal that they mistakenly believed had spots on its skin.

See also
 Biodiversity of Cape Town
 List of nature reserves in Cape Town
 Swartland Shale Renosterveld

References

 
Nature reserves in Cape Town
Protected areas of the Western Cape
Renosterveld